Schubert is a crater on Mercury. It was named after Franz Schubert, a famous Austrian composer, by the IAU in 1976.

Schubert has been filled in by smooth plains material.

Nearby craters include Wergeland to the north, Nampeyo to the northeast, and Bramante to the southwest.

References

Impact craters on Mercury
Franz Schubert